Tiago Miguel Luís Rosa (born 6 March 1986) is a Portuguese professional footballer who plays as a defender.

External links 
 
 

1986 births
Living people
Association football defenders
Portuguese footballers
G.D. Tourizense players
Atlético Clube de Portugal players
Clube Oriental de Lisboa players
Associação Naval 1º de Maio players
U.D. Leiria players
Académico de Viseu F.C. players
F.C. Penafiel players
C.D. Fátima players
Segunda Divisão players
Liga Portugal 2 players
Primeira Liga players
Footballers from Lisbon